Andris Reiss (Kuldīga, 10 March 1978) was a Latvian former professional cyclist. He rode in the 2002 Vuelta a España, finishing 95th overall. He also competed in the road race at the 2000 Summer Olympics, and finished in 81st place.

Major results
1998
 5th National Road Race Championships
2001
 1st  National Road Race Championships
 2nd Giro del Medio Brenta
 2nd Overall Girobio

References

External links
 
 
 
 

Olympic cyclists of Latvia
People from Kuldīga
Living people
1978 births
Cyclists at the 2000 Summer Olympics